Symmetrischema capsica, the pepper flowerbud moth, is a moth in the family Gelechiidae. It was described by John David Bradley and Dalibor F. Povolný in 1965. It is found Mexico, the West Indies, the Caribbean (Trinidad and Tobago) and the south-eastern United States, where it has been recorded Florida and Texas.

The length of the forewings is 3-3.5 mm. The forewings are ash gray, mottled with dark gray and yellowish orange and with two or three grayish-black longitudinal dashes. The hindwings are gray.

The larvae feed in the flower buds of Capsicum annuum and Physalis species.

References

Symmetrischema
Moths described in 1965